Geochemical Perspectives Letters is a peer-reviewed open access scholarly journal publishing original research in geochemistry. It is published by the European Association for Geochemistry.

Abstracting and indexing 
The journal is abstracted and indexed in:

References

External links 
 

Open access journals
Publications established in 2015
English-language journals
Geochemistry journals